The , branded "DENCHA" (Dual Energy Charge Train), is a two-car battery electric multiple unit (BEMU) train operated by Kyushu Railway Company (JR Kyushu) on inter-running services over the Fukuhoku Yutaka Line and Chikuhō Main Line in Fukuoka Prefecture in northern Kyushu, Japan, since October 2016, and also on the Kashii Line.

Design
Based on the earlier 817 series electric multiple unit (EMU) trains, styling of the trains was overseen by industrial designer Eiji Mitooka.

The lithium-ion battery system used has a capacity of 360 kWh and operates at 1.6 kV.

Operations

Since late 2018/early 2019, they are also used on the non-electrified Kashii Line.

These newer vehicles used on the Kashii Line belong to the "300" series (11 trainsets in total), while the slightly older ones used on the Wakamatsu Line are the "0" series (7 trainsets in total).

Formations
, the fleet consists of eighteen two-car sets formed as follows, with one motorised ("Mc") car and one non-powered trailer ("TC") car.

 The KuMoHa BEC819 car has one single-arm pantograph.
 The KuHa BEC818 car has a toilet at the inner end.

Interior
Internally, LED lighting is used throughout.

History

Initial details of the new train were formally announced by JR Kyushu on 29 January 2016. A pre-series two-car train was delivered from Hitachi's factory in Yamaguchi Prefecture in April 2016. This underwent testing before entering revenue-earning service on 19 October 2016.
In May 2017, the BEC819 series was awarded the 2017 Blue Ribbon Award, presented annually by the Japan Railfan Club.

Build histories

The individual build histories of the fleet are as follows.

See also
 Smart BEST, a self-charging BEMU train developed by Kinki Sharyo in 2012
 EV-E301 series, a DC BEMU introduced by JR East on the Karasuyama Line in 2014
 EV-E801 series, an AC BEMU introduced by JR East on the Oga Line in 2017

References

Further reading

External links

 JR Kyushu press release (29 January 2016) 

819
Kyushu Railway Company
Train-related introductions in 2016
Hitachi multiple units
20 kV AC multiple units
Battery electric multiple units